Edward Goss (28 November 1875 – 1 September 1955) was an Australian cricketer. He played four first-class cricket matches for Victoria between 1905 and 1907.

See also
 List of Victoria first-class cricketers

References

External links
 

1875 births
1955 deaths
Australian cricketers
Victoria cricketers
Cricketers from Melbourne